Ralph (pronounced   or  ) is a male given name of English origin, derived from the Old English Rædwulf and Old High German Radulf, cognate with the Old Norse Raðulfr (rað "counsel" and ulfr "wolf").

The most common forms are:
 Ralph, the common variant form in English, which takes either of the given pronunciations.
 Rafe, variant form which is less common; this spelling is always pronounced , as are all other English spellings without "l".
 Raife, a very rare variant.
 Raif, a very rare variant.
 Ralf, the traditional variant form in Dutch, German, Swedish, and Polish.
 Ralfs, the traditional variant form in Latvian.
 Raoul, the traditional variant form in French.
 Raúl, the traditional variant form in Spanish.
 Raul, the traditional variant form in Portuguese and Italian.
 Raül, the traditional variant form in Catalan.
 Rádhulbh, the traditional variant form in Irish.

Given name

Middle Ages

 Ralph the Timid (died 1057), pre-Conquest Norman earl of Hereford, England
 Ralph de Gael (1042–1096), the Earl of East Anglia (Norfolk and Suffolk) and Lord of Gaël and Montfort, leader of the Revolt of the Earls
Ralph de Diceto (c. 1120 – c. 1202), archdeacon of Middlesex, dean of St Paul's Cathedral (from c. 1180), and author of two chronicles, the Abbreviationes chronicorum and the Ymagines historiarum
 Ralph d'Escures (died 1122), Abbot of Séez, Bishop of Rochester and Archbishop of Canterbury
 Ralph Neville (died 1244), Archbishop of Canterbury
 Ralph de Maidstone (died 1245), Bishop of Hereford
 Ralph Baldock (died 1313), Bishop of London and Lord Chancellor of England in 1307
 Ralph Stratford (c. 1300 – 1354), Bishop of London
 Ralph de Neville, 1st Earl of Westmorland (1364–1425), English peer
 Ralph Percy (died 1464), English knight
 Saint Ralph Sherwin (died 1581), Catholic saint and English martyr
 Ralph de Warneville (died 1191), twentieth Lord Chancellor of England as well as later Bishop of Lisieux in Normandy

Modern world
 Ralph Abercromby (1734–1801), Scottish soldier and politician, one of the principal commanders of French Revolutionary Wars and French campaign in Egypt and Syria
 Ralph Abernathy (1927–1990), American civil rights leader, minister and a close associate of Martin Luther King, Jr.
 Ralph Abraham (mathematician) (born 1936), American mathematician
 Ralph Abraham (politician) (born 1954), member of the US House of Representatives
 Ralph Adams Cram (1863–1942), American architect of collegiate and ecclesiastical buildings
 Ralph Allen (disambiguation)
 Ralph Backstrom (1937–2021), Canadian hockey player
 Ralph Bakshi (born 1938), American director of animated and live-action films
 Ralph Barbieri (1945–2020), American sports radio personality
 Ralph Henry Barbour, American novelist, who primarily wrote popular works of sports fiction for boys
Ralf Baartmans, Dutch DJ and Electronic music producer known as Ralvero 
 Ralph Bass (1911–1997), American rhythm and blues record producer and talent scout for several independent labels
 Ralph Beard (1927–2007), American basketball player
 Ralf Becker (born 1970), German footballer, coach and administrator
 Ralph F. Beermann (1912–1977), American politician, member of the US House of Representatives
 Ralph Bellamy (1904–1991), American actor
 Ralf Bendix (1924–2014), German singer 
 Ralph Blane (1914–1995), American composer, lyricist and performer
 Ralf Bochröder (born 1940), German marathon runner
 Ralph Branca (1926–2016), American Major League Baseball pitcher
 Ralph Brinkhaus (born 1968), German politician 
 Ralph Brown, English actor and writer
 Ralph Bunche (1903–1971), American political scientist, academic and diplomat
 Ralph Burns (1922–2001), American songwriter, bandleader, composer, conductor, arranger and bebop pianist
 Ralph Byrd (1909–1952), American actor
 Ralph Carmichael, composer and arranger of secular pop music and contemporary Christian music
 Ralph Chaplin (1887–1961), American writer, artist and labor activist
 Ralph Chase (1902–1989), American football player
 Ralph Louis Cohen (born 1952), American mathematician
 Ralph Connor (1860–1937), Canadian novelist and church leader
 Ralph Connor (scientist) (1907–1990), American chemist
 Ralph Cook (born 1944), Associate Justice of the Alabama Supreme Court
 Ralph Cooperman (1927–2009), British Olympic fencer
 Ralph D. Cornell (1890–1972), American landscape architect
 Ralph Cudworth (1572/3–1624), English scholar, cleric and theologian (father of Ralph Cudworth)
 Ralph Cudworth (1617–1688), English philosopher, theologian, the leader of the Cambridge Platonists
 Ralph DeLoach (1957–2022), American football player
 Ralph Drollinger (born 1954), American basketball player and clergyman
 Ralph Earl (1751–1801), American painter known for his portraits
 Ralph Earle, several people
 Ralph Earnhardt (1928–1973), American racing driver and patriarch of the Earnhardt racing family
 Ralph Edwards (disambiguation)
 Ralph Ellison (1913–1994), American novelist, literary critic and scholar
 Ralph Waldo Emerson (1803—1882), American essayist, lecturer and poet
 Ralph Fiennes (born 1962), English actor and director
 Ralph Foster (disambiguation)
 Ralph A. Gamble (1885–1959), Republican politician who represented Westchester County, New York in the United States House of Representatives
 Ralph Goldstein (1913–1997), American Olympic épée fencer
 Ralph E. Gomory (born 1929), American applied mathematician and IBM executive
 Ralph_Heywood
 Ralph Horween (1896–1997), American football player for Harvard Crimson and in the NFL, centenarian
 Ralf Hütter (born 1946), German musician
 Ralph Ince (1887–1937), American pioneer film actor, director and screenwriter
 Ralph Isselhardt (1910–1972), American football player
 Ralph B. Ives (1973–1934), American businessman
 Ralph Jackson (born 1962), American basketball player
 Ralph Jarvis (born 1965), American player of gridiron football
 Ralph Jodice, American Air force General, one of the principal commanders of 2011 military intervention in Libya and Operation Unified Protector 
 Ralph Johnson (disambiguation)
 Ralph Jones (1880–1951), American high school and college football and basketball coach
 Ralph Kaminski (born 1990), Polish singer-songwriter
 Ralph Kerr (1891–1941), officer in the Royal Navy who served in First and Second World Wars, one of the principal commanders of Battle of the Denmark Strait 
 Ralph Kiner (1922–2014), American Hall-of-Fame Major League Baseball player
 Ralph Klein (1942–2013), Canadian politician, Premier of Alberta
 Ralph Klein (basketball) (1931–2008), Israeli basketball player and coach
 Ralph Knibbs (born 1964), British rugby union player
 Ralph Kuncl, American neurologist and academic
 Ralph Lauren (born 1939), American fashion designer
 Ralph Liguori (1926–2020), American racing driver
 Ralph Macchio (born 1961), American actor
 Ralph McQuarrie (1929–2012), American conceptual designer and illustrator, noted for his work in the Star Wars trilogy
 Ralph Michael (1907–1994), English actor
 Ralf Moeller (born 1959), German actor
 Ralph Morgan (1883–1956), American actor
 Ralph Morgan (rugby) (c.1920–2009), Welsh rugby union and league player
 Ralph Nader (born 1934), American political activist, author, lecturer and attorney
 Ralph Nichols (1910–2001), English badminton player
 Ralph Nichols (American football) (1874–1949), American politician and college football player and head coach
 Ralph Northam (born 1959), American politician
 Ralph Percy, 12th Duke of Northumberland (born 1956), English landowner
 Ralph "Bucky" Phillips (born 1962), American fugitive
 Ralf Rangnick (born 1958), German football coach and manager 
 Ralph Recto (born 1964), Filipino politician
 Ralph David Richardson (1902–1983), English actor
 Ralph Sadler (1507–1587), English diplomat, Privy Councillor, Secretary of State and Chancellor of the Duchy of Lancaster
 Ralf Schumacher (born 1975), German former racing driver
 Ralph Sheheen (born 1964), motorsport broadcaster
 Ralph Shortey, (born 1982) American politician
 Ralph Siegel (born 1945), German record producer and songwriter 
 Ralph F. Smart, (1908–2001) British film producer and director
 Ralph Stanley (1927–2016), American bluegrass/traditional music performer
 Ralph Terry (born 1936), American former professional baseball player and golfer
 Ralph Dundas Tindal, Dutch military leader 
 Ralph A. Vaughn (1907–2000), African-American academic, architect and film set designer
 Ralph Waite (1928–2014), American actor and political activist
 Ralph Waller (born 1945), Methodist Minister, former Principal of Harris-Manchester College, Oxford, former Pro-Vice Chancellor of Oxford University
 Ralph Wammack (1867–1945), American politician, Missouri senator
 Ralph Webb (American football) (born 1994), American football player
 Ralph Vaughan Williams (1872–1958), English composer
 Ralph Wilson (1918–2014), founder and owner of the Buffalo Bills National Football League team
 Ralf Wolter (1926–2022), German actor 
 Ralph Yarborough (1903–1996), American politician, longtime senator from Texas
 Ralph Young (disambiguation)
 Ralph Young (singer) (1918–2008), American singer and actor

Surname
 Bo Ralph (born 1945), Swedish linguist
 Brian Ralph (born 1973), American cartoonist
 Caleb Ralph (born 1977), New Zealand rugby union footballer
 Damani Ralph (born 1980), Jamaican football player
 David Ralph (born 1972), Scottish field hockey forward
 Dicky Ralph (1908–1989), Welsh international rugby player
 Elena Ralph (born 1984), Miss Israel 2005
 Elsie Reasoner Ralph (1878–1913), first female war correspondent in US history
 Glencora Ralph (born 1988), Australian water polo player
 Hanna Ralph (1888–1978), German actress
 J. Ralph (born 1975), American composer, singer/songwriter and producer
 Josh Ralph (athlete) (born 1991), Australian athlete
 James Ralph (died 1762), American-born English political writer, historian and reviewer
 James Ralph (cricketer) (born 1975), English cricketer
 Jessie Ralph (1864–1944), American actress
 Kharis Ralph (born 1992), Canadian former ice dancer
 Mark Ralph (field hockey) (born 1980), Scottish field hockey player
 Michael Ralph (born c.1963), American actor and comedian
 Nathan Ralph (born 1993), English footballer
 Richard Ralph (born 1946), British ambassador
 Richard Ralph (Missouri politician), American politician, Missouri senator
 Shea Ralph (born 1978), American basketball player and coach 
 Sheryl Lee Ralph (born 1956), American actress and singer

Fictional characters
 Ralph Cifaretto, on The Sopranos
 Ralph Furley, on Three's Company
 Ralph Kramden, portrayed by Jackie Gleason on The Honeymooners
 Ralph Malph, on Happy Days
 Ralph Wiggum, on The Simpsons
 Ralph Jones, title character of King Ralph, a 1991 American comedy film starring John Goodman
 the title character of Ralph 124C 41+, a 1911 science fiction novel
 Ralph, in the Wolf and Sheepdog Warner Bros. cartoons
 Ralph, from the comic strip Drabble
 Ralph, from the comic strip Sally Forth
 Ralph Dring, in the UK sitcom Dear John
 Ralph Drang, in the US sitcom Dear John
 Wreck-It Ralph, the title character of the 2012 Disney computer animated film Wreck-It Ralph
 Ralph, a dog in the animated film Balto III: Wings of Change
 Ralph "Ralphie" Parker, main character/narrator of the 1983 Christmas movie A Christmas Story
 Ralph Theodore Guard, a security guard at Warner Bros. in the animated series Animaniacs
 Ralph, a giant wolf monster from the video game Rampage
 The title character from the children's novel The Mouse and the Motorcycle
 Ralph Nickleby, uncle of Nicholas in the novel Nicholas Nickleby by Charles Dickens
 Ralph Rackstraw in the comic opera H.M.S. Pinafore
 Sir Ralph Shawcross from the TV series You Rang, M'Lord?
 Ralph Waldo Simpson, a character on the American television sitcom Gimme a Break
 Ralph Hinkley "Hankley" from the TV series The Greatest American Hero
 Ralph, the main protagonist in William Golding's 1954 novel Lord of the Flies, and also the two film adaptations: the 1963 film and the 1990 film.
 Ralph, on Detroit: Become Human

See also
 
 Ralphs, a supermarket chain in Southern California, USA
 Ralphie, a related given name
 Radulf (disambiguation)
 Rafe (given name)
 Raul and its French cognate Raoul (disambiguation)
 Rudolph

References

Masculine given names
English masculine given names
Irish masculine given names
Scottish masculine given names
German masculine given names
Dutch masculine given names
Norwegian masculine given names
Swedish masculine given names
Danish masculine given names

de:Ralf
es:Raúl
eo:Rolfo
fr:Raoul
la:Radulphus
pt:Ralf
sv:Ralf